Jeffreyston Pastures is a Site of Special Scientific Interest (or SSSI) in Pembrokeshire, South Wales. It has been designated as a Site of Special Scientific Interest since January 1996 in an attempt to protect its fragile biological elements.

Type
This site is designated due to its biological qualities. SSSIs in Wales have been notified for a total of 142 different animal species and 191 different plant species.

See also
List of Sites of Special Scientific Interest in Pembrokeshire

References

External links
Natural Resources Wales website

Sites of Special Scientific Interest in Pembrokeshire